Atalaia do Norte is the most western municipality in the Brazilian state of Amazonas. As of 2020, its population was 20,398 and its area is 76,355 km², thus making it the third largest municipality in Amazonas and the seventh largest in Brazil.

Geography
The area of this municipality includes the Vale do Javari, an indigenous reserve which is inhabited until the present day by isolated Indians also called "arrow peoples", indigenous ethnic groups that have had little or no contact with modernity. The town is at the start of the Itaquai River.

References

Municipalities in Amazonas (Brazilian state)
Populated places established in 1955
1955 establishments in Brazil